Edelweißlahnerkopf is a mountain of Bavaria, Germany.

Mountains of Bavaria
Berchtesgaden Alps
Mountains of the Alps